The Shire of Mount Marshall is a local government area in the Wheatbelt region of Western Australia, about  north-northwest of Merredin and about  northeast of the state capital, Perth.

History
The first European explorer in the area was Surveyor General John Septimus Roe; Mount Marshall and Lake McDermott were named after early Swan River Colony settler Marshall McDermott, cashier of the Bank of Western Australia, magistrate, and a director of the Agricultural Society of Western Australia. The area was first settled by sandalwood collectors and graziers in 1868. Sandalwood was removed from this area from the 1880s until the 1920s. Permanent settlement and the development and clearing of the land for farms commenced around 1910.

The Mount Marshall Road District was established on 6 July 1923 from areas formerly falling within the Ninghan Road District and Nungarin Road District. On 1 July 1961, it became a shire following the passage of the Local Government Act 1960, which reformed all remaining road districts into shires.

Wards
The Shire has no wards and each Councillor represents the entire district of the Shire of Mt Marshall as required by the Local Government Act 1995.

Towns and localities
The towns and localities of the Shire of Mount Marshall with population and size figures based on the most recent Australian census:

(* indicates locality is only partially located within this shire)

Heritage-listed places
As of 2023, 50 places are heritage-listed in the Shire of Mount Marshall, of which none are on the State Register of Heritage Places.

References

External links
 

Mount Marshall